The UK Rock & Metal Singles Chart is a record chart which ranks the best-selling rock and heavy metal songs in the United Kingdom. Compiled and published by the Official Charts Company, the data is based on each track's weekly physical sales, digital downloads and streams. In 2004, there were 24 singles that topped the 52 published charts. The first number-one single of the year was "Christmas Time (Don't Let the Bells End)" by The Darkness, which topped the chart for the first time in the final week of 2003 and spent the first three weeks of the year and one in march at number one. The final number-one single of the year was "Boulevard of Broken Dreams" by Green Day, which spent the final three weeks of the year atop the chart and remained at number one for the first two weeks of 2005.

The most successful song on the UK Rock & Metal Singles Chart in 2004 was "In the Shadows" by Finnish band The Rasmus, which spent ten weeks at number one. The band also spent two weeks at number one with follow-up single "Guilty". "Come Get Some" by Rooster spent six weeks at number one, while The Darkness (with "Christmas Time (Don't Let the Bells End)" and "Love Is Only a Feeling") and Green Day (with "American Idiot" and "Boulevard of Broken Dreams") each spent six weeks at number one with two releases. "Last Summer" by Lostprophets spent three weeks at number one, while three additional singles – "Run" by Snow Patrol, "The Reason" by Hoobastank and "Slither" by Velvet Revolver – spent two weeks each at number one on the chart during the year.

Chart history

See also
2004 in British music
List of UK Rock & Metal Albums Chart number ones of 2004

References

External links
Official UK Rock & Metal Singles Chart Top 40 at the Official Charts Company
The Official UK Top 40 Rock Singles at BBC Radio 1

2004 in British music
United Kingdom Rock and Metal Singles
2004